FC Dunav (officially named "Дунав от Русе") is a Bulgarian professional football club based in Ruse, which currently competes in the Second League, the second tier of the Bulgarian football league system.

Part of a larger sports branch, Dunav were established on February 16, 1949, as a merger of two local football clubs in the city, Dinamo and Rusenets. Nicknamed The Dragons, Dunav's home colours are sky blue and white. Named after the Danube River, on the banks of which the city of Ruse is situated, the club plays its home matches at the local Gradski stadion, which has a seating capacity of 13,000 spectators.

Among the club's most notable achievements are a final in the Bulgarian championship in 1937, a First League fourth place in 1975, 1989 and 2017, and four domestic cup finals in 1938, 1939, 1941 and 1962 respectively. The club’s most recent top flight participation has been during the 2019–20 season.

History

Domestic
Over the course of its history, the club carried a variety of different names such as Sava, Napredak, Levski, Varush, Angel Kanchev, Rakovski, Rusenets, Dinamo, Spartak, DNA, Torpedo and Partizanin. Dunav played in the A Group over a number of seasons between 1937 and 1940, 1951, 1956, 1958–67, 1968–73, 1974–77, 1984–86, 1988–91 and 1996–98, before being relegated again.

Following years of several movements between lower divisions, a decent squad, established by playing manager Engibar Engibarov at the time, eventually won the Cup of Bulgarian Amateur Football League in 2003–04 and for the next season they finally gained promotion to the B PFG after a long-term absence in the amateur divisions. It was to be their first appearance in professional football since the club was relegated from the A Group in 1991.

From January 5, 2006 until October 2 of the same year, Dunav were managed by Ferario Spasov. He acquired some well-known footballers and loaned talented players from Litex Lovech in an unsuccessful attempt to reach the first division again.

The 2009–10 season in the B Group was very narrow for the club as the dream of reaching the A Group almost became a reality. Dunav finished the first half of the season in first place, leaving behind the teams of Kaliakra Kavarna and Nesebar. The second half of the season started very well and the team was in a row with a couple of very significant wins, but they won only one game in their last 7 matches and eventually failed to gain promotion to the top flight.

In the following years, Dunav again failed to impress and was mostly seen as a middle table club in the final ranking of the B Group. In 2010–11, the club was left by some of its good players, as a result of ongoing financial difficulties in the team. Dunav subsequently withdrew from the B Group in February 2011, after being unable to reduce its financial debts to the municipality and a majority of its squad players. A few days later, the club announced bankruptcy and was dissolved.

In 2011, Dr. Simeon Simeonov established a new entity under the name Dunav 2010, which was approved by the BFU to start from the lowest levels of Bulgarian football. The team obtained license and after several court decisions in the following months, it regained the traditions and history of its predecessor. In 2015, the club won the Bulgarian Amateur Cup and was promoted to the second division.

In 2016, Dunav 2010 became champions of the 2015-16 B Group and were promoted to the top flight for the first time since 1991, 25 years after their last participation. They completed in the debut season of the newly renamed Bulgarian First League. Their first year in the BFL was an instant success, as they finished fourth and qualified for Europa League.

Ever since, Dunav's financial situation has been very unstable, despite the club playing in the top tier.

During the winter break of the 2019–20 season, Dunav owners stated that the team might face administrative relegation if a new income source is not provided on time.
However, the club continued to participate in the top tier until the very end of the 2019-20 season, finishing 13'th in the league, proceeding to relegation Group B in the company of fellow top tier Botev Plovdiv ( losing 3–1 at Plovdiv), FC Arda ( winning 2–0 at Kardjali) and Botev Vratsa ( losing 3–1 at Ruse, Bulgaria). As a result, finishing 4'th in the group ( last place), qualifying for the relegation playoffs. In a group, competing against Botev Vratsa ( drawing 0–0 at Vratsa) and Tsarsko Selo ( winning 1–0 at Rousse), finishing second in the group. Second place meaning a Relegation play-off final against the third from the Second Professional Football League (Bulgaria), where Dunav lost 4–1 to FC Montana, thus being relegated.
However, Dunav's financial situation and poor ownership led to the club being taken over by the fans' association and academy coaches, announcing on 4 August 2020 that Dunav will compete in the Third League.

After two seasons in the third level, Dunav managed to promote to the Second League, at the end of the 2021–22 season.

European
On an international basis, Dunav's debut entry in the European club competitions dates back to the 1975-76 UEFA Cup, where they were drawn against Roma of the Italian Serie A. Dunav were subsequently eliminated after a 2–0 defeat in Rome and a notable 1–0 win over the Italian team in Ruse. In 2017, they managed to secure a spot in the first qualifying round of the Europa League after a prolonged period of European absence, but were eliminated by Irtysh Pavlodar after an overall 0–3 loss in both legs.

Honours

Domestic
First League:
 4th place: 1974–75, 2016–17
Second League:
  Winners (6): 1950, 1954, 1957, 1968, 1974, 2015–16
Third League:
  Winners (2): 2014–15, 2021–22

Fourth League:
 Winners (1): 2010–11

Bulgarian Cup:
  Runners-up: 1961–62

Cup of Bulgarian Amateur Football League: 
  Winners (2 times - record): 2004, 2015

European
UEFA Europa League
 First round: 1975–76
 First Qualifying Round: 2017-18

League positions

European record

Matches

Players

Current squad 
 

For recent transfers, see Transfers summer 2022.

Past/Current seasons

References

External links 
 Official website

 
Dunav Ruse
Ruse, Bulgaria
Dunav Ruse
1949 establishments in Bulgaria
Phoenix clubs (association football)